William Havard Eliot (1796–1831) was an architect and builder of the Tremont House in Massachusetts, and he participated in the musical life of the city. His father was the banker Samuel Eliot.  He was married to Margaret Boies (Bradford) Eliot, a daughter of Alden Bradford, and together they had the son Samuel Eliot.

Variants of his names include Hayward, Harvard, Havard, Howard, and Elliott. William Havard Eliot died suddenly in 1831 while campaigning for mayor.

Architects from Boston
1796 births
1831 deaths